Masters of Chant Chapter V is the seventh album by German band Gregorian. It was released on March 31, 2006.

Note: Gregorian's album The Dark Side was also released in Oceania under the name Masters of Chant V. Aside from the title change, the Oceanic release is The Dark Side with the addition of the track Engel.

Track listing
 "Heroes" (featuring Sarah Brightman (as Hepsibah)) (David Bowie) (5:35)
 "Comfortably Numb" (Pink Floyd) (7:55)
 "Send Me an Angel" (featuring Sarah Brightman (as Hepsibah)) (Real Life) (4:55)
 "Silent Lucidity" (featuring Amelia Brightman (as Violet)) (Queensrÿche) (6:19)
 "Lady in Black" (Uriah Heep) (5:56)
 "The Forest" (5:08)
 "A Weakened Soul" (featuring Amelia Brightman (as Violet)) (5:17)
 "Lucky Man" (Emerson, Lake & Palmer) (5:22)
 "Stop Crying Your Heart Out" (Oasis) (5:16)
 "We Love You" (The Rolling Stones) (4:49)
 "Boulevard of Broken Dreams" (Green Day) (5:13)
 "The Unforgiven" (Metallica) (7:40)
 "I Feel Free" (Cream) (3:38)

References

2006 albums
Covers albums
Gregorian (band) albums